Nicolaus Gabrieli  (born 31 January 1645 – 12 April 1717) was a Roman Catholic prelate who served as Bishop of Novigrad (1684–1717).

Biography
Nicolaus Gabrieli was born in Villa Rivolti, Codroipo, Italy on 31 January 1645 and ordained a priest on 21 September 1670. On 19 June 1684, he was appointed during the papacy of Pope Innocent XI as Bishop of Novigrad. On 25 June 1684, he was consecrated bishop by Alessandro Crescenzi (cardinal), Cardinal-Priest of Santa Prisca, with Giuseppe Bologna, Archbishop Emeritus of Benevento, and Francesco Maria Giannotti, Bishop of Segni, serving as co-consecrators. He served as Bishop of Novigrad until his death on 12 April 1717.

References

External links and additional sources
 (for Chronology of Bishops) 
 (for Chronology of Bishops) 

17th-century Roman Catholic bishops in Croatia
Bishops appointed by Pope Innocent XI
1645 births
1717 deaths